Albert Riera Vidal (born 28 December 1983) is a Spanish former professional footballer who is currently the manager of New Zealand Northern League club Auckland City. Riera spent the majority of his playing career in New Zealand, mainly appearing as a defensive midfielder for Auckland City in the New Zealand Football Championship and for Wellington Phoenix in the A-League.

Playing career
Born in Barcelona, Catalonia, Riera played with local teams, at the beginning in Aragon (CD Binéfar and Atlético Monzón), and later in Catalonia (CF Balaguer, FC Benavent and CFJ Mollerussa).

Auckland City
Riera debuted with Auckland City on 21 February 2011, coming on as a substitute in the 73rd minute of a match against AS Magenta in the 2010–11 OFC Champions League. Riera and Auckland City went on to win the Champions League, with Riera coming on as a substitute in two games (against Magenta and against Waitakere United) and starting in two (against Tefana and against Amicale). In the 2010–11 New Zealand Football Championship Riera played in a total of five games, as well as the four games in the OFC Champions League.

In the 2011–12 season Riera played in 24 matches with Auckland City. Domestically, he played in 14 matches in the New Zealand Football Championship, in which Auckland City won the premiership, and in the ASB Charity Cup match against Waitakere United. Riera also played in all 8 matches of the OFC Champions League, in which he won the Golden Ball award for best player of the tournament, and played together with Auckland City in the FIFA Club World Cup, where they were eliminated in the first round, after losing to Kashiwa Reysol.

In the 2012–13 season Riera played in 26 matches with Auckland City. Domestically, he played in 16 matches in the New Zealand Football Championship, in which Auckland City took 2nd place, and in the ASB Charity Cup match against Waitakere United. Riera scored his first goal in the opening round of the domestic league against Canterbury United. Riera also played in 8 matches of the OFC Champions League, helping Auckland City win their fifth title of the competition, and their third consecutive title. Once again he played for Auckland City in the FIFA Club World Cup, where they were eliminated in the first round, after losing to Sanfrecce Hiroshima.

Wellington Phoenix
Riera was signed by Wellington Phoenix of the A-League on 7 October 2013, after they had played a pre-season friendly against Auckland City. He debuted for Wellington Phoenix in the opening match of the 2013–14 season against Brisbane Roar, coming on as a substitute in the 55th minute.
Halfway through the season, he signed a year-long extension to his contract with Wellington Phoenix. Riera was named the Phoenix's player of the year for the 2013–14 season.

Riera announced his retirement from the Phoenix on 21 May 2016.

Return to Auckland City
Riera's retirement was short lived, as he signed for his former club Auckland City for the 2016–17 New Zealand Football Championship season.

Coaching career
He left Auckland City at the end of the 2020–21 season to take up a role as assistant manager of West Coast Rangers, newly formed to compete in the Northern League, along with former Auckland City teammate Ángel Berlanga. On 4 May 2021, after a poor start to the 2021 Northern League season, manager Chris Acott stepped down and was replaced by Riera; however, West Coast Rangers could not avoid relegation to NRFL Division 1.

On 1 December 2021, it was announced that Riera would return to Auckland City as their new manager for the 2022 Northern League season.

Personal life
In October 2018, Riera became a New Zealand citizen.

Managerial statistics

Honours

Player
Auckland City
 New Zealand Football Championship Premiers: 2011–12
 ASB Charity Cup: 2011
 OFC Champions League: 2010–11, 2011–12, 2012–13
 A-League All Stars: 2014

Individual
 OFC Golden Ball: 2011–12

Manager
Auckland City
Northern League: 2022

References

External links
 Auckland City official profile
 

1983 births
Living people
Spanish footballers
Footballers from Barcelona
Association football midfielders
Tercera División players
CF Balaguer footballers
Auckland City FC players
Wellington Phoenix FC players
New Zealand Football Championship players
A-League Men players
Spanish expatriate footballers
Expatriate association footballers in New Zealand
Spanish expatriate sportspeople in New Zealand
CD Binéfar players
Atlético Monzón players
Naturalised citizens of New Zealand
Spanish emigrants to New Zealand